Squirtle, known as  in Japan, is a Pokémon species in Nintendo and Game Freak's Pokémon franchise. It was designed by Atsuko Nishida. Its name was changed from Zenigame to Squirtle during the English localization of the series in order to give it a "clever and descriptive name." Its name is composed of squir- from squirt and -tle from Turtle. In animated appearances, Squirtle is voiced in Japanese by Rikako Aikawa and in English localizations by Eric Stuart, and later Michele Knotz. Squirtle, in the anime, never evolved for reasons which are never truly explained by the creators.

In the main series games, Squirtle can evolve into Wartortle at level 16 or 14 depending what game you are playing, which can further evolve into Blastoise at level 36 or 34. It is known as the "Tiny Turtle Pokémon". It also appeared in Super Smash Bros. Brawl and Super Smash Bros. Ultimate.

Design and characteristics
Squirtle was designed as one of the starter Pokémon of Pocket Monsters Red and Green by Atsuko Nishida, who based its design on its final form, a turtle-esque Pokémon that ultimately was scrapped and replaced with Blastoise. Originally called "Zenigame" in Japanese, Nintendo decided to give the various Pokémon species "clever and descriptive names" related to their appearance or features when translating the game for western audiences as a means to make the characters more relatable to American children. Squirtle's English name is a portmanteau of the words "squirt" and "turtle."

Squirtle, known as the Tiny Turtle Pokémon, are turtle Pokémon with large eyes and chubby cheeks, capable of moving either on two feet or on all fours. Their skin is a light blue, and they possess a long, curled tail. When feeling threatened, Squirtle withdraw their limbs into their brown-orange shells and spray water from their mouth with great force, either to attack their opponent or merely to intimidate it. If attacked anyway, their shells are resilient, and provide excellent protection. It shelters itself in its shell, then strikes back with spouts of water at every opportunity. Squirtle's shell is not merely used for protection. The shell's rounded shape and the grooves on its surface help minimize resistance in water, enabling this Pokémon to swim at high speeds. The idea to feature Squirtle and the other Red and Blue starters in a significant role in Pokémon X and Y came about a year and a half into the development of the games. The Mega Evolutions for the three Pokémon's final forms were created, and the designers decided that they should give players an opportunity to receive one of these Pokémon in order to see their Mega Evolved form.

Appearances

In the video games
The first video game appearance of Squirtle was in Pokémon Red and Blue, then appearing on other Pokémon games such as Pokémon Yellow, Pokémon Stadium, Pokémon Gold and Silver, Pokémon Crystal, Pokémon Stadium 2, Pokémon Ruby and Sapphire, Pokémon FireRed and LeafGreen, Pokémon Emerald, Pokémon Diamond and Pearl, Pokémon Platinum, Pokémon HeartGold and SoulSilver, Pokémon Black and White, Pokémon Black 2 and White 2, Pokémon X and Y, Pokémon Omega Ruby and Alpha Sapphire, Pokémon: Let's Go, Pikachu! and Let's Go, Eevee!, and Pokémon Sword and Shield.

Outside of the main series, Squirtle appears in Hey You, Pikachu!, Pokémon Snap, Pokémon Pinball, Pokémon Stadium, Pokémon Channel, Pokémon Trozei!, Pokémon Mystery Dungeon: Blue Rescue Team and Red Rescue Team, Pokémon Ranger, Pokémon Mystery Dungeon: Explorers of Time and Explorers of Darkness, Pokémon Mystery Dungeon: Explorers of Sky, Pokémon Ranger: Shadows of Almia, Pokémon Rumble, PokéPark Wii: Pikachu's Adventure, Pokémon Rumble Blast, PokéPark 2: Wonders Beyond, Pokémon Rumble U, Pokémon Battle Trozei, Pokémon Shuffle, Pokémon Rumble World, Pokémon Super Mystery Dungeon, Pokémon Picross, Pokémon Rumble Rush, Pokémon Mystery Dungeon: Rescue Team DX, Pokémon Café Mix, Pokémon Masters EX, Pokémon Go, Pokkén Tournament, New Pokémon Snap, and Pokémon UNITE. In Super Smash Bros. Brawl, Squirtle is now playable character under the command of the Pokémon Trainer, alongside Ivysaur and Charizard which must be switched between in order to avoid fatiguing the Pokémon. Squirtle returns as a playable character in Super Smash Bros. Ultimate for Nintendo Switch, once again linked with Ivysaur and Charizard, although the removal of the fatigue mechanic means that an entire match can be played effectively using Squirtle alone.

In anime
In the animated series, Ash Ketchum, Brock, and Misty encounter a gang of five Squirtle known as the Squirtle Squad in his debut episode "Here Comes the Squirtle Squad!". They first appear as delinquents, but their interactions with Ash and Co. result in them becoming honorary firefighters of their town. The leader of the gang, however, chooses to go with Ash and battle for him; throughout Ash's journey through the Kanto region, it is an invaluable member of Ash's team, and proves its strength without ever evolving. Eventually, the Squirtle parts ways with Ash in order to lead its old gang, who were suffering a lack of proper guidance. Despite returning to its hometown, Squirtle will happily aid Ash whenever he requests it. Whenever Squirtle appears he puts on a pair of black pointed sunglasses. Some think he does this because his Pokédex number is 007 which relates to the movie James Bond. Ash's second female companion, May received her own Squirtle from Professor Oak. May's Squirtle was very young and timid until evolving, despite being recently born, it quickly grows accustomed to the Pokémon Contests May participates in, even helping May win some, earning Ribbons as rewards. After May leaves Ash's group, she temporarily reunites with him in Sinnoh, revealing that many of her Pokémon had now evolved; Squirtle has since evolved into Wartortle. Eric Stuart does the voice of Squirtle up until late in Ash's Hoenn adventure; Michelle Knotz takes over his role afterwards.

Squirtle is also the main protagonist of Pokémon Mystery Dungeon: Team Go-Getters Out Of The Gate!; this Squirtle actually happens to be a young boy, transformed and sent to a world completely inhabited by Pokémon.

Squirtle also appeared in the background of the movie Detective Pikachu.

In other media
Green, the original female protagonist in the Pokémon Adventures, stole a Squirtle from Professor Oak's laboratory. It was not seen until Chapter 15, "Wartortle Wars", by which point it had evolved into a Wartortle, nicknamed Turtley, which she used to try and escape from another trainer, Red, chasing her.

In the Pokémon: Pikachu Shocks Back manga, when Pikachu is separated from Ash temporarily it meets a cynical Squirtle, who believes Ash has abandoned Pikachu. Later, Ash has caught a Squirtle of his own, which accompanies Ash throughout his journeys in the Orange Islands.

Reception
Since it appeared in the Pokémon series, Squirtle has received generally positive reception. It has been featured in several forms of merchandise, including figurines, plush toys, and the Pokémon Trading Card Game. Squirtle was featured among other Pokémon as part of Burger King kids' meal cards. Analysts predicted that Squirtle, along with Pikachu, Bulbasaur, and Charmander, would lead the merchandising of the Pokémon series. David Caballero of Screen Rant included Squirtle on the 10 cutest water-types Pokémon. Andrew Webster of The Verge claimed Squirtle is a best Pokémon of all time. Ryan Gilliam of Polygon claimed that Squirtle is the best starter Pokémon which was always the roundest one. According to Time magazine, Squirtle was considered one of the "more popular" in the original series. Boys' Life named Squirtle "one of the five coolest Pokémon from Pokémon FireRed and LeafGreen", placing second on their list. The Richmond Times-Dispatch editor Douglas Durden commented that Squirtle was a "favourite Pokémon" of the series. Author Patrick Drazen discussed the anime incarnation and commented that Squirtle asserted its alpha male status by "wearing an even more outrageous pair of sunglasses" than the other Squirtles in its gang. San Antonio Express-News editor Susan Yerkes called Squirtle "disgustingly cute". An editor for IGN called Squirtle "the best between Bulbasaur and Charmander", citing how many Pokémon are disadvantageous to Squirtle. IGN editor "Pokémon of the Day Chick" preferred Squirtle as well, citing how it is the only one of the three that is only one type when it reaches its final form. However, she commented that Squirtle seems "boring" due to there being many pure Water types. IGN stated "Leave it to Nintendo to have a cute turtle", further calling it "cuter than the Mario series Koopa Troopas". GamesRadar editor Brett Elston noted that while Charizard and Bulbasaur get "big props" from Pokémon players, Squirtle appears to be "more popular" from people who are not fans of the series, suggesting that its appearance may be a part of it. GamesRadar editor Carolyn Gudmundson commented that Squirtle was the "coolest" of the three starting Pokémon in the anime. Author Maria S. Jones called Squirtle "cute and cuddly". IGN ranked it the 46th best Pokémon ever. An author noted that it was "instantly recognisable" to anyone who has been "around an eight year-old at some point in the last 15 years." Game Informer also included it in its list of the best Pokémon at #03 (along with Charmander and Bulbasaur). Author O'Dell Harmon noted the choice between these three Pokémon as the "most important" one in the series' history. Official Nintendo Magazines readers voted it as the second best Water-type Pokémon. Author Thomas East called it "one of the cutest" and "one of the most popular." Pocket Gamer listed and criticize Squirtle as the worst Pokémon, and stated that Squirtle is just a turtle. Steven Bogos of The Escapist listed Squirtle as 40th of their favorite Pokémon, describing it as "adorably bad-ass."

Squirtle was among eleven Pokémon chosen as Japan's mascots in the 2014 FIFA World Cup.

References

External links

 Squirtle on Bulbapedia
 Squirtle on Pokemon.com

Pokémon species
Super Smash Bros. fighters
Video game characters introduced in 1996
Fictional turtles
Video game characters with water abilities

ca:Línia evolutiva de Squirtle#Squirtle
cs:Seznam pokémonů (1-20)#Squirtle
da:Pokémon (1-20)#Squirtle
es:Anexo:Pokémon de la primera generación#Squirtle
fr:Carapuce et ses évolutions#Carapuce
pl:Lista Pokémonów (1-20)#Squirtle
fi:Luettelo Pokémon-lajeista (1–20)#Squirtle